Lysine demethylase 7A is a protein that in humans is encoded by the KDM7A gene.

References

Further reading

External links 
 PDBe-KB provides an overview of all the structure information available in the PDB for Human Lysine-specific demethylase 7A (KDM7A)

Human proteins